Lycophotia velata is a moth of the  family Noctuidae. It is found in eastern Asia, including Siberia and Japan.

External links
Japanese Moths

Lycophotia
Moths of Japan